Major Porto is a district of Patos de Minas, a municipality in the state of Minas Gerais in the Southeast region of Brazil.

See also
Patos de Minas

References

Populated places in Minas Gerais